The Fourth Man is a 2007 Serbian thriller film directed by Dejan Zečević.

Cast 
 Nikola Kojo - Major
 Marija Karan - Teodora
 Dragan Petrović - Inspektor
 Bogdan Diklić - Pukovnik
 Dragan Nikolić - Politicar
 Boris Milivojević - Mafijas
 Radoslav Milenković - Biznismen
 Semka Sokolović-Bertok - Komsinica
 Miloš Timotijević - Telohranitelj
 Feđa Stojanović - Inspektor Petrovic

References

External links 
 

2007 action films
2007 films
Films set in Serbia
Films set in Belgrade
Serbian action films
Films about the Serbian Mafia
Fictional Serbian military personnel
Films shot in Belgrade
2000s Serbian-language films